Kasey James French (born January 19, 1997) is an American soccer player who currently plays college soccer at the University of Washington.

Career
French has been part of the Seattle Sounders FC Academy since 2012.  On February 6, 2015, it was announced that French signed a letter of intent to play college soccer at the University of Washington.  However, he did not join the Huskies as he continued to play for the Sounders U18's.  On March 30, he made his professional debut for Seattle Sounders FC 2 in a 4–0 over Whitecaps FC 2.

On February 3, 2016, French would once again sign to play college soccer at the University of Washington, joining fellow academy teammates Handwalla Bwana and John Magnus.

References

External links
USSF Development Academy bio

1997 births
Living people
American soccer players
Washington Huskies men's soccer players
Tacoma Defiance players
Seattle Sounders FC U-23 players
Association football defenders
Soccer players from Washington (state)
USL Championship players
USL League Two players
People from Lacey, Washington